Now Do U Wanta Dance is the fifth album by Graham Central Station. Released on April 1, 1977, the album peaked at number twelve on the Billboard Top Soul Albums.

Track listing 
All songs written by Larry Graham except where indicated.

"Happ-E-2-C-U-A-Ginn" 	3:55 	
"Now Do-U-Wanta Dance" 	2:56 	
"Last Train" 	3:53 	
"Love and Happiness" (Al Green, Mabon Hodges)  3:37
"Earthquake" 	6:44 	
"Crazy Chicken"  1:01
"Stomped Beat-Up and Whooped" 	3:43 	
"Lead Me On" (Deadric Malone)  3:38
"Saving My Love For You" 	3:52 	
"Have Faith in Me" 	6:40

Personnel 
Larry Graham - bass, synthesizer, keyboards, lead and backing vocals
Hershall "Happiness" Kennedy - keyboards, synthesizer, clavinet, trumpet
Gaylord "Flash" Birch - drums, vocals
David "Dynamite" Vega - guitar
Gail "Baby Face" Muldrow  - guitar, vocals
Robert "Butch" Sam -  keyboards, organ, piano, vocals
Tina Graham, Natalie Neilson, Shelia McKinney - vocals 
Dennis Marcellino, Jerry Martini, Max Haskett, Mic Gillette - horns

Charts

Singles

References

External links
 Graham Central Station-Now Do U Wanta Dance at Discogs

1977 albums
Graham Central Station albums
Warner Records albums